Hamoudi Mosque is a mosque in Djibouti City, Djibouti.

History
The mosque was built in 1897 by Haji Hamoudi. It is among the older standing masjids in the capital.

Capacity
Hamoudi Mosque has the capacity to accommodate up to 1,000 worshippers.

See also
 Religion in Djibouti
 List of mosques in Africa
 Islam in Djibouti

External links

Abbasid architecture
Buildings and structures in Djibouti (city)
Mosques completed in 1906
Mosques in Djibouti
1906 establishments in the French colonial empire